The Representation Act, 1985 is an act of the Parliament of Canada and was passed by the 33rd Canadian Parliament in 1985. 

Included within the act is the Constitution Act, 1985 (Representation), it guaranteed that no province would drop below the number of seats it had in 1985.

References

Constitution of Canada
Canadian federal legislation
1985 in Canadian law